The Radical People's Party, founded as the Labour Democrats (Norwegian: Arbeiderdemokratene), was a radical political party in Norway mainly active from 1906 to 1936, targeting workers and smallholders. The party was founded by Johan Castberg, who led the party until his death in 1926.

History
The party was a successor to the United Norwegian Workers' Association (Norwegian: De forenede norske Arbeidersamfund, DFNA), a labour organisation associated with the Liberal Party, which due to conflicts with the mother party fielded Johan Castberg as a parliamentary candidate in the 1900 election. Castberg in turn founded a new party, the Labour Democrats in 1906. The party took part in its first election in 1906, and in 1912 and 1915 it won six parliamentary representatives.

For most of its history, the party cooperated with the Liberal Party. The party had its strongest support among small-scale farmers and landless agricultural labourers, based in a non-socialist ideology. In 1921 the party changed its name to the Radical People's Party (although its members continued to be referred to as "Labour Democrats").

The party eventually went into a steady decline. Only in Oppland did the party retain some influence. In the 1918 election, the party was reduced to one representative. At the election in 1936, it fell out of parliament altogether. After the Second World War the party had effectively merged into the Liberal Party, although formally the parties had joint lists in Oppland until 1957. The party was formally dissolved in 1965.

References 

 
Political parties established in 1906
1906 establishments in Norway
Political parties disestablished in 1965
1965 disestablishments in Norway
Liberal parties in Norway
Labour parties
Radical parties
Defunct political parties in Norway